Kalarooch, also known as Kalaroos, is a pass of Kupwara district in the union territory of Jammu and Kashmir, India. It is surrounded by mountains which increases its beauty.

Demographics
According to the 2011 census of India, Kalarooch has 5007 households. The literacy rate of Kalarooch village was 48.76% compared to 67.16% of Jammu and Kashmir. In Kalarooch, Male literacy stands at 59.72% while the female literacy rate was 35.55%.

Transport

Rail
The nearest railway stations to Baramulla are Sopore railway station and Baramulla railway station both located at a distance of 42 kilometres respectively.

Air
The nearest airport is Srinagar International Airport located at a distance of 95 kilometres and is a 2.5-hour drive.

See also
Lolab Valley
Kupwara
Drugmulla

References

Villages in Kupwara district